Dulas Bridge spans Dulas Brook, a tributary of the River Wye in Hay-on-Wye, Powys, Wales.

The Dulas bridge, near Hay station, was a joint counties bridge—Brecknock and Radnor. Those counties refused to widen the bridge to correspond with the improvements of the local board, and the chairman of the local board (F. R. Trumper) undertook and succeeded in raising the money for doing the work by public subscription. The rebuild was completed in 1884.

In 1839, the Dulas Bridge was described as having one arch.

References

Bibliography

Bridges across the River Wye
Buildings and structures in Powys
Hay-on-Wye